István Balogh (21 September 1912, Budapest – 27 October 1992, Budapest) was a Hungarian footballer who played for Újpest FC, as well as representing the Hungarian national football team at the 1938 FIFA World Cup.

Although Hungary got to the final of the tournament Balogh only featured in their opening game, a 6-0 win against the Dutch East Indies. He went on to coach Újpest FC from 1948-1949 and again from 1958-1959.

References

1912 births
1992 deaths
Footballers from Budapest
Hungarian footballers
Hungary international footballers
Újpest FC players
1938 FIFA World Cup players
Association football midfielders
Hungarian football managers
Újpest FC managers
20th-century Hungarian people